Gérard Bessière (born 1928) is a French diarist, poet, priest of the Diocese of Cahors, former national chaplain for the teaching staff of university parish, former journalist of the weekly magazine La Vie, and author of numerous books on spirituality. He is now retired to a village in Lot.

Career 
Bessière was born in Luzech, Lot, in south-western France. His studies took place at the seminaries in Gourdon, in Cahors and the Institut Catholique de Paris. After studying theology, philosophy, exegesis and Biblical languages, he obtained a Philosophy Degree at the Sorbonne University, and was occupied for a long time with clergy training in the department of Lot. He has collaborated with the publishing house Éditions du Cerf, for which he created the collection . Together with Hyacinthe Vulliez he founded the magazine . He made headlines in 2009 by excommunicating the pope.

Selected publications 
 Where is the Pope?, 1974
 Jesus Ahead, Burns and Oates, 1977
 Alors Jésus s'assit et dit…, collection « Contes du Ciel et de la Terre ». Gallimard Jeunesse, 1993
 Jesus Sat Down and Said…, Creative Education, 1997
 Jésus : Le dieu inattendu, collection « Découvertes Gallimard » (nº 170), série Religions. Éditions Gallimard, 1993.
 With Francesco Chiovaro, Urbi et Orbi : Deux mille ans de papauté, collection « Découvertes Gallimard » (nº 269), série Religions. Éditions Gallimard, 1995.
 With Hyacinthe Vulliez, Frère François : Le saint d'Assise, collection « Découvertes Gallimard » (nº 354), série Religions. Éditions Gallimard, 1998.

References 

1928 births
Living people
French Roman Catholic priests
20th-century French male writers
21st-century French male writers
Institut Catholique de Paris alumni
University of Paris alumni